Gregory Michael Bryk (born 19 August 1972) is a Canadian film and television actor. He has appeared in numerous films and television series and is best known for his reoccurring roles in ReGenesis (2004–2008), XIII: The Series (2011–2012), Bitten (2014–2016) and Frontier (2016–2018).

He is also known for his role in the 2018 video game Far Cry 5, which he portrayed the game's lead antagonist Joseph Seed through performance capture. He reprised the role in Far Cry: New Dawn (2019) and Far Cry 6 (2021).

Early life and education
Bryk graduated from Queen's University in Kingston, Ontario in 1994 with a Bachelor of Arts in drama. While attending Queen's, he was a member of the football team as a linebacker. During his time on the team, he helped the Gaels win the 28th Vanier Cup.

Personal life
Bryk met his wife, Danielle Bryk, while both were studying English literature at Queen's University. The couple has 3 children together, his elder son Dempsey, who is also an actor, son Billy, and daughter Ella.

Filmography

Film

Television

Video games

References

External links

1972 births
Living people
20th-century Canadian male actors
21st-century Canadian male actors
Male actors from Winnipeg
Canadian male film actors
Canadian male television actors
Canadian male voice actors
Circle in the Square Theatre School alumni